The Big Rivers Conference, or BRC, is a high school athletic conference in Western Wisconsin.  It participates in the WIAA.

Member schools
Current schools in the Big Rivers Conference are:
Chippewa Falls Cardinals
Eau Claire Memorial Old Abes
Eau Claire North Huskies
Hudson Raiders
Menomonie Mustangs
Rice Lake Warriors
River Falls Wildcats (non-football sports only until 2022)
Superior Spartans (football only)
New Richmond Tigers

Former schools
La Crosse Central Red Raiders
La Crosse Logan Rangers
Marinette Marines
Menominee (MI) Maroons
Rice Lake Warriorso
Wausau High School Lumberjacks (1956–1973) - Left conference in 1973 to return to the Wisconsin Valley Conference after Wausau split into Wausau East High School and Wausau West High School (1970).

See also
List of high school athletic conferences in Wisconsin

External links
Big Rivers Conference Website
BRCFootball.com

Wisconsin high school sports conferences
High school sports conferences and leagues in the United States